Mount Donbeh or Kuh-e Donbeh is a mountain which is situated just southwest of the city of Isfahan in Isfahan Province in Iran. Stretching in a northwest-southeast direction, Mount Donbeh is located south of the Zayanderud River and northwest of Mount Soffeh in the Sanandaj-Sirjan geologic and structural zone of Iran. The mountain is mainly formed of Lower Cretaceous limestone. Only the southeastern part of the mountain is made of Jurassic shale.

References

Mountains of Iran
Landforms of Isfahan Province
Mountains of Isfahan Province